Cape Rey is a dark rocky cape between the southwest side of Darbel Bay and the northeast side of Lallemand Fjord, on the west coast of Graham Land. Discovered by the French Antarctic Expedition, 1908–10, under Charcot, and named by him for Lieutenant Joseph J. Rey, French Navy, meteorologist of the French Antarctic Expedition under Charcot, 1903–05.
 

Headlands of Graham Land
Loubet Coast